Arle Grove is a  nature reserve in Gloucestershire. The site is listed in the 'Cotswold District' Local Plan 2001-2011 as a Key Wildlife Site (KWS).

The site is owned and managed by the Gloucestershire Wildlife Trust. It was donated to the Trust as a nature reserve in 2009.

Location and habitat
The reserve is an example of ancient woodland which supports a wide range of species. It is about 500 m to the north of Dowdeswell and is near Whittington.  It is near a former reserve which was held under lease being Dowdeswell Reservoir and Wood. It is near the Cotswold Way national trail.

Survey
Arle Grove is being surveyed to establish the full range of flora and fauna.

Publications
 ‘Nature Reserve Guide – discover the wild Gloucestershire on your doorstep’ - 50th Anniversary, January 2011, Gloucestershire Wildlife Trust

References

External links
 Gloucestershire Wildlife Trust

Nature reserves in Gloucestershire
Cotswolds
Forests and woodlands of Gloucestershire